, there are 277 known disc golf courses in Canada on the official PDGA Course Directory. Below is a listing of disc golf courses in Canada by province and territory. In January of 2021, the PDGA announced that the Baker Park Disc Golf Course (in Calgary, Alberta) was the most played course in Canada for 2020. This was determined by total U-Disc submitted rounds; the actual number of disc golfers throwing at Baker Park is though to be upwards of ten times more than what was logged and reported.

Alberta

British Columbia 

Rotary Marina View Disc Golf Course, Penticton, 2016, 9

Ontario

Quebec

See also 
List of disc golf courses in the United States

Ken Westerfield disc sports history in Canada

Notes

References 

 
Canada
Disc golf courses
Disc golf courses